Chimila is a genus of square-headed wasps in the family Crabronidae. There are about six described species in Chimila.

Species
These six species belong to the genus Chimila:
 Chimila cerdai Leclercq, 2005 i c g
 Chimila cooperiana Leclercq, 1980 i c g
 Chimila hondurana Leclercq, 2005 i c g
 Chimila mocoana Leclercq, 1980 i c g
 Chimila pae Pate, 1944 i c g
 Chimila tinguana Leclercq, 1980 i c g
Data sources: i = ITIS, c = Catalogue of Life, g = GBIF, b = Bugguide.net

References

Further reading

 
 

Crabronidae